Hellinsia crescens is a moth of the family Pterophoridae. It is found in Colombia, Ecuador, Brazil, Venezuela and Costa Rica.

The forewings are grey‑brown and the markings are dark brown. The hindwings are dark brown‑grey and the fringes grey‑brown. Adults are on wing in January, March and December, at an altitude of 1,700 to 3,500 meters.

References

Moths described in 1926
crescens
Pterophoridae of South America
Moths of Central America